On 9 October 2001, Pratima Gaonkar, a young, Indian, intersex athlete and swimmer, was found dead in a well in Goa. The cause was identified as death by suicide; this was in turn was caused by Gaonkar's reaction to the disclosure and public commentary surrounding a failed sex verification test. Gaonkar was reportedly the subject of blackmail attempts, including an accusation by her mother that her coach was accusing her. 

Originally from the  village of Sadgal, Goa, three months prior to her death she won silver medal in the 4×400 relay in the Junior Asian Athletics Championships in Brunei. She had previously broken all the Goan state-level records for her discipline.

In the aftermath of her death, media attention and reportage was invasive, with a press conference discussing her body in detail. The public discourse which surrounded her death as an intersex athlete has led to comparisons with Dutee Chand and Caster Semenya.

References 

2000s in India
2001 deaths
Deaths in India
Women deaths
Intersex sportspeople
LGBT rights in India